Puebla de Obando is a municipality located in the province of Badajoz, Extremadura, Spain. According to the 2005 census (INE), the municipality has a population of 2033 inhabitants. It is the birthplace of former Real Madrid and now Deportivo Alavés goalkeeper, Fernando Pacheco Flores.

References

Municipalities in the Province of Badajoz